Tufani may refer to:

 Tufani, a village in Independenţa, Constanţa County, Romania
 Tufani, a village in Drăgăneşti, Prahova County, Romania